Virginia Alice Stroud (born 1951) is a Cherokee-Muscogee Creek painter from Oklahoma. She is an enrolled member of the United Keetoowah Band of Cherokee Indians.

Early life
Virginia Stroud was born on 13 March 1951 in Madera, California. Her mother died when she was eleven, so Stroud moved to Muskogee, Oklahoma to live with her sister. She sold her first painting at the age of 13.

Stroud graduated from Muskogee High School in 1968. From 1968 to 1970, she attended Bacone College and studied art under Cheyenne painter Dick West, who made her his studio assistant. She then attended the University of Oklahoma.

In her late 20s, Stroud was adopted, following Kiowa tradition, as a daughter of Evelyn Tahome and Jacob Ahtone, a Kiowa couple.

Pageants and the Tear Dress
In 1969, Stroud served as Miss Cherokee Tribal Princess. She went on to win the title Miss National Congress of American Indians in 1970, and in 1971, she was crowned Miss Indian America XVII. When Stroud competed for the title of princess in 1969, Cherokee women wanted her to represent the tribe in a "traditional" Cherokee outfit, which was problematic since Cherokee women wore contemporary mainstream fashions for at least two centuries and wore very little clothing before that. A committee of Cherokee women, appointed by Chief W. W. Keeler designed a dress based on a hundred-year-old Cherokee dress owned by a Cherokee lady, Wynona Day, and from surrounding Southeast tribes' formal regalia, and they created the "Tear Dress."

Art career
Stroud paints with tempera and gouache and is a fine art printmaker. She also has written and illustrated several children's books. She draws inspirations from ancient pictographs and historical ledger art. Over her career, Stroud developed a narrative style with minimal facial details in her people and lavish floral backgrounds. She also paints kinetic wooden sculptures and fine art furniture.

Her work is in such public collections as the Gilcrease Museum, Millicent Rogers Museum, Philbrook Museum of Art, Fred Jones Jr. Museum of Art, Cherokee Heritage Center, and Cherokee Nation Entertainment.

Of her work, Stroud says, "I paint for my people. Art is a way for our culture to survive... perhaps the only way."

Honors
In 1970, Stroud became the youngest Native artists to win first place in the Woodlands division of the Philbrook Museum's annual juried art show. In 1982, the Indian Arts and Crafts Association honored Stroud as Artist of the Year. The Five Civilized Tribes Museum declared Stroud a Master Artist in 1986. In 2000, she was given the Cherokee Medal of Honor.

Published works
Doesn't Fall off His Horse: A Cherokee Tale. Dial, 1994. .
 A Walk to the Great Mystery: A Cherokee Tale. Dial, 1995. .
 The Path of the Quiet Elk: A Native American Alphabet Book. Dial, 1996. .

See also
 Sharron Ahtone Harjo

Notes

References
Conley, Robert L. A Cherokee Encyclopedia. Albuquerque: University of New Mexico Press, 2007. .
 Lester, Patrick D. The Biographical Directory of Native American Painters. Norman: Oklahoma University Press, 1995. .
Power, Susan C. Art of the Cherokee: Prehistory to Present. Athens, Georgia: University of Georgia Press, 2007. 

Cherokee artists
Native American painters
Painters from Oklahoma
1951 births
Living people
Bacone College alumni
Native American writers
American women painters
United Keetoowah Band people
Native American women artists
21st-century American women artists
20th-century Native Americans
21st-century Native Americans
20th-century Native American women
21st-century Native American women